At the 1920 Summer Olympics in Antwerp, 21 events in shooting were contested. The competitions were held from 22 July 1920 to 3 August 1920.

Medal summary

Participating nations

A total of 234 shooters from 18 nations competed at the Antwerp Games:

Medal table

References

External links
 

 
1920 Summer Olympics events
1920
Olympics
Shooting competitions in Belgium